The 2011 Campeonato da Primeira Divisão de Futebol Profissional da FGF (2011 FGF First Division Professional Football Championship), better known as the 2011 Campeonato Gaúcho or  Gaúcho, was the 91st edition of the top-flight football league of the Brazilian state of Rio Grande do Sul. The season began on 16 January and ended on 15 May. Internacional successfully defended in the final its 2010 title.

Format
The sixteen clubs were divided into two groups that would contest in only two matches to determine which four teams from each group would qualify to the play-offs. The first stage called Taça Piratini 2012 (Piratini Cup 2012, won by Caxias) had each team from one group play only one club in the other group. In the second stage, called Taça Farroupilha 2012 (Farroupilha Cup 2012, won by Grêmio) each club within each group played one match against a club in the group. The two lowest ranked teams in the overall standings were relegated (Internacional (SM) and Porto Alegre.

Teams

1Universidade Sport Club was renamed to Canoas Sport Club on 26 November 2010.

Taça Piratini

First stage

Group A standings

Group B standings

Playoffs

Taça Farroupilha

First stage

Group A standings

Group B standings

Playoffs

Overall table
The overall table considers only the matches played during the first stage of both Taças and will define the two teams that will be relegated to play lower levels in 2012.The Taça Champions are placed on the top of the table. The best placed team not playing in Campeonato Brasileiro Série A (Grêmio, Internacional), B or C (Caxias) will be "promoted" to 2011 Campeonato Brasileiro Série D. The best two teams not qualified to 2012 Copa Libertadores will qualify for 2012 Copa do Brasil. The final round game between Internacional-SM and Porto Alegre was cancelled after the relegation of both teams.

See also
2011 Copa FGF

References

External links
Federação Gaúcha de Futebol

Campeonato Gaúcho seasons
Gaucho